The Mercedes-Benz 500K (W29) is a grand touring car built by Mercedes-Benz between 1934 and 1936.  First exhibited at the 1934 Berlin Motor Show, it carried the factory designation W29. Distinguished from the 500 sedan by the "K" for Kompressor (German for supercharger), only fitted to these performance cars, it succeeded the Mercedes-Benz 380 introduced just the previous year.  It offered both a larger, more powerful engine and more opulent coachwork to meet customers' demands for greater luxury and performance.

Specifications

The 500K used the same independent suspension as had been introduced on the 380, with a double wishbone front axle, double-joint swing axle at the rear, and separate wheel location, coil springs and damping, a world first. Consequently, it was a more comfortable and better handling car than Mercedes' previous S/SS/SSK generation of roadsters from the 1920s, and offered greater appeal to buyers, particularly the growing number of well-heeled female drivers of the time.

The short "A" chassis, with a  wheelbase, underpinned the two-seater models: the Motorway Courier, and the 1936 Special Roadster which offered the highest performance. All models featured such advanced equipment as safety glass, hydraulic brakes, and a 12-volt electrical system sufficient to bear the load of the electric windscreen wipers, door locks, and indicators.

Production figures

Of the combined production of the 500K (342 cars), including 29 "Special Roadsters" during its two years in production, and the later 540K (419 cars) from Sindelfingen, the deliveries were:
 70 chassis without body
 28 open cars (offener Tourenwagen)
 23 sedans with 4 doors (mainly 500K)
 29 sedans with 2 doors (mainly 540K)
 12 Coupés
 6 Autobahn cruisers (Autobahn-kurier)
 58 Roadsters
 116 Cabriolets A
 296 Cabriolets B
 122 Cabriolets C

Gallery

References

Notes

Bibliography

External links

  Mercedes-Benz Classic Center USA presents the 500K Cabriolet at Amelia Island Concours d'Elegance
  Klassik-Oldtimer-Klatt presents the 500K Cabriolet

500K
1930s cars
Rear-wheel-drive vehicles
Cars introduced in 1934